Titterstone Clee Hill, sometimes referred to as Titterstone Clee or Clee Hill, is a prominent hill in the rural English county of Shropshire, rising at the summit to  above sea level.

It is one of the Clee Hills, in the Shropshire Hills Area of Outstanding Natural Beauty. The nearest town to the hill is Ludlow, which can be seen from parts of Cleehill village.

Geography
Titterstone Clee is the third-highest hill in Shropshire, surpassed only by the nearby Brown Clee Hill and Stiperstones. Much of the higher part of the hill is common land, used for the grazing of sheep, air traffic control services and both working and disused quarries. The summit of Titterstone Clee is bleak, treeless and shaped by decades of quarrying. Many of the industrial structures still remain.

Most of the summit of the hill is affected by man-made activity, the result of hill fort construction during the Bronze and Iron Ages and, more recently, by years of mining for coal and quarrying for dolerite, known locally as 'dhustone', for use in road-building. Many derelict quarry buildings scattered over the hill are of industrial archaeological interest as very early examples of the use of reinforced concrete.

The village of Cleehill lies on this road as it crosses the hill. On the northeast slope of the hill is the small village of Cleeton St Mary.

Geology
The hill rises above the surrounding countryside by virtue of its distinctive geology, the igneous rocks capping both Titterstone Clee and Clee Hill being more resistant to erosion than the neighbouring sedimentary rocks. Most of the lower ground is underlain by mudstones and sandstones of Devonian age and collected together as the Old Red Sandstone. The uppermost part of this succession is the St Maughans Formation and on the northern and western sides it rises almost to the summit where it is then capped by a hard-wearing dolerite sill. A similar but larger and separate intrusion caps Clee Hill to the south.

The Old Red Sandstone is unconformably overlain by Carboniferous Limestone which locally is accounted for by the Orton Limestone Formation and the Lower Limestone Shale Group. These rocks occur in a curved outcrop to the south of Cleehill village and to the north around Farlow. Overlying this is the Cornbrook Sandstone formation, the local representative of the Millstone Grit underlying the ground between Cleehill village and Knowle and also to the northeast of the hill.  This is succeeded by the mudstones, siltstones and sandstones of the Lower and Middle Coal Measures which makes up much of the rest of the surface of the hill extending southwest to Knowbury and northeast beneath Catherton Common. It contains seatearths and coal seams which have been worked in the past. The lowermost and most extensive of these, just above the basal sandstone of the Coal Measures is known as the 'Gutter Coal'.

The dark coloured dolerite of the sill is known locally as Dhu Stone ('dhu' may have arisen from the Welsh 'du' meaning 'black'). It is an olivine basalt which appears to have been intruded as a sill between sandstone layers within the unconsolidated strata of the Middle Westphalian sediments soon after deposition of the latter.

A fault system runs ENE-WSW across the southern flanks of these hills. The northerly downthrowing Leinthall Earls Fault runs off to the WSW whilst the Titterstone Clee Fault runs off the ENE. Other smaller faults, some at right angles to these named faults, affect both the sedimentary strata dn the intruded sills.

Near the summit is the Giant's Chair – a pile of boulders created during cold phases of the Devensian ice age.

History, quarrying and land usage
Near the summit trig point are the remains of a Bronze Age cairn, dating back up to 4,000 years and indicating that the summit was a likely ceremonial site. Although partly destroyed by quarrying, Titterstone Clee's Iron Age hill fort or encampment, enclosed by a huge boundary earthworks, has fared better than those on Brown Clee. It is of note that the walls of the fort are made up of stone blocks, instead of earth banks. 

Clee Hill is one of only a few hills and mountains noted on the Hereford Mappa Mundi, a 13th-century map of the world displayed at Hereford Cathedral.

In medieval times ironstone and, later, coal were mined, in particular from bell pits: localised mine shafts, one of which has now flooded to form a lake. Over the years large numbers of quarries were opened up on Titterstone Clee to exploit the dolerite. All but one, on Clee Hill, are now abandoned. The largest quarries have sheer drops of up to around 100 feet (30m).

Before the Second World War, the area would be described as industrial, because of the presence of wide-scale quarrying and associated activity. Men came from places such as Bridgnorth and Ludlow to work in the quarries, and the villages of Bedlam and Dhustone on Titterstone Clee were built especially for the quarry workers. Crumbling remains of quarry buildings now litter the hill, reminders of a bygone industry that once employed more than 2,000 people here. An old  narrow gauge railway incline is still visible on the hill and a large concrete structure under which the wagons were filled with stone still remains next to the modern day car park. Nearby, on the flanks of Clee Hill, a standard gauge railway incline provided means of exporting quarried stone from above Cleehill village. This railway infrastructure remained intact until abandoned in the early 1960s. In the past the quarries have also been worked (on a much smaller scale) for coal, fireclay and limestone.

Early in the 20th century, a further large quarry (the Magpie Quarry) opened on the eastern side of Clee Hill and an aerial ropeway was built to carry stone off the hill eastwards to the railway at Detton Ford. The footings for the tall pylons which supported the wires still remain near the summit, parallel to the modern day track to the radar domes. 

During the Second World War, in September 1941, a radar station was set up on Titterstone Clee under cover of being a Royal Air Force station under the name of RAF Clee Hill, which housed between 40-50 personnel. Initially the radar and wireless crew lived in huts within the station which made for cold living conditions in winter but it ceased to be residential in September 1956 when crew were allowed to board in Ludlow. The station, latterly commanded by a Flight Lieutenant, disbanded and closed in September 1957. However it was reactivated in 1964 under the oversight of the Civil Aviation Authority.
Several radar domes and towers currently operate on the summit of the hill. The largest of the radar arrays is part of the National Air Traffic Services (NATS) radar network, and covers one of 30 overlapping regions of UK airspace. The one on Titterstone Clee monitors all aircraft within a 100-mile radius. The smaller of the two is a Met Office weather radar station which is part of a network of 16 across the country used to detect cloud precipitation (rain). The domes and masts are well-known local landmarks, with one in particular often being nicknamed 'the golf ball'.

Clee Hill is still quarried behind Cleehill village. Quarrying resumed here in the late 1980s, 50 years after the Titterstone Clee Dhustone quarry closed just below the summit. The main buildings of the quarry are just visible from the A4117 road but virtually hidden from view by ingenious landscaping.

A 20th century triangulation pillar marks the summit.

Access and recreation
The summit area and unenclosed upper slopes of Titterstone Clee, along with Clee Hill to its south, were mapped as 'open country' under the provisions of the Countryside and Rights of Way Act 2000 and thereby freely available to walkers. There is in addition a dense network of footpaths and bridleways running both across the unenclosed land and also the enclosed farmland surrounding the hill. Thus Titterstone Clee is popular with walkers and picnickers, but much less so than nearby hills such as the Long Mynd. From the summit the Shropshire Way runs north to Brown Clee Hill, southwest to Ludlow and east to Cleobury Mortimer. Another long-distance trail, the Jack Mytton Way runs along the northeastern margin of the hill.

In fiction
Titterstone Clee plays a central role in the Ellis Peters' novel The Virgin in the Ice.

See also
 Clee Hill Junction, near Bitterley, was the location of the railway junction and transfer sidings which connected the inclines to the main railway network.

References

External links
 Shropshire Geology – Titterstone Clee
 Computer generated summit panorama from Titterstone Clee
 BBC Shropshire photo gallery
 Simon Denison – Quarry land

Hills of Shropshire
Industrial railways in England
Marilyns of England
Radar stations
3 ft gauge railways in England
Railway inclines in the United Kingdom